() is a 31 km long river originating in Poland but flowing mostly through Karviná District, Moravian-Silesian Region, Czech Republic. It is the right tributary of the Olza River, to which it enters in Závada (part of Petrovice u Karviné).

It begins in vicinity of Cieszyn (Pastwiska) and then flows north through Hażlach, Kończyce Wielkie, Kończyce Małe, Zebrzydowice, where it veers west towards Marklowice Górne, Dolní Marklovice, Petrovice u Karviné and Závada.

See also 
 Polish minority in the Czech Republic

References 
 

Rivers of Poland
Rivers of Silesian Voivodeship
Rivers of the Moravian-Silesian Region
Karviná District
Cieszyn Silesia
International rivers of Europe